Culture of cosmetic surgery is the attitude towards cosmetic changes via surgery over time, though this attitude depends on the purpose. WWI left thousands of soldiers with unprecedented levels of facial damage, creating a massive need for reconstruction of facial features, as such Harold Gillies of New Zealand developed and tested methods to restore function and structure to the faces of soldiers and these processes rapidly gained popularity. Throughout the 1940s and 50s fashion and personal appearance was emphasized more strongly in the United States. As ideas about what was considered beautiful changed, services, products, and techniques were developed to help consumers meet those standards if they so chose. People may undertake plastic surgery in the modern era due to their mental state and lack of confidence in their own bodies. Individuals may turn to getting something changed about themselves via surgery because it requires less mental/emotional work and reduces body dysmorphia.

Origins/ History

World War I as Birth of Reconstructive Surgery 
World War I left thousands of soldiers with unprecedented levels of facial damage; trench warfare and progressive weapons lead to massive amounts of death and destruction. Explosions and rapid gunfire left those who survived with horribly disfigured faces, creating a dire demand for medical intervention. Dr. Harold Gillies of New Zealand developed and tested methods to restore function and structure to the faces of soldiers, such as taking cartilage or skin from an easily concealed part of the patient's body and using it to reform the injured area. Due to the thousands of soldiers in need of immediate medical attention, there were no shortage of willing trial subjects. Gillies based his work on methods that had been developed previously, but were never intended for such drastic application. He improved upon these efforts and, when combined with anaesthesia and sedating medication, found his techniques rapidly gaining in popularity. The call for doctors able to perform facial reconstruction grew rapidly and received national attention. Dr. Varaztad Kazanjian became the first recognized post-war plastic surgery specialist at Harvard Medical School. Years after the war ended, the supply of patients in need of life-saving facial reconstruction was steadily reducing. As such, surgeons were able to take on less dire cases, such as industrial accidents or other injuries. Techniques and procedures became more advanced and public knowledge of them grew.

Changing Beauty Standards and Evolution of Technology 
Throughout the 1940s and 50s fashion and personal appearance was emphasized more strongly in the United States; both world wars were over and years in the past, and normalcy was returning to the average American household. As ideas about what was considered beautiful changed, services, products, and techniques were developed to help consumers meet those standards if they so chose. Women felt pressure to be symmetrical, have smooth skin, and by slim yet curvy in all the right places. Being too thin was equated with being fragile and sickly, but being too large suggested poor self-care. The emphasize on bust-waist-hip measurements grew, with Miss America's proclaimed ideal in the 1950s being 36-24-36. Despite the physical risks they carry, corsets and waist-trainers returned to popularity during this time to help women achieve the "hourglass figure" that was so sought after. While fitted dresses and push-up bras were readily available, some women chose to undergo surgery to enhance their bodies. The rate of breast augmentation operations soared in the 1960s, and a decade later rates of anorexia-nervosa hit record highs. In the 1970s breast reduction surgery became more prevalent, as well as reduction of the thighs and buttocks. These surgeries were newly developed and experimental; some common unintended outcomes were numbness, loss of range of motion, and infection.

Psychological Relationships to Cosmetic Surgery 
Many people who have plastic surgery in today’s era choose to do so because of their mental state and lack of confidence in their own bodies. Instead of working to accept and love what they look like as they are, millions of people turn to getting something changed about themselves instead because it requires less mental/ emotional work and is readily available. One example of this is people with eating disorders; a person who has body dysmorphia may try and get surgery in order to feel that they are skinnier than they already are. The major problem with this is that many eating disorder patients are not overweight, so this surgery will not be helpful to their physical health or appearance. These patients expect to come out of the operation room looking like a new person, and they believe that they will be able to feel confident in this new body. This can happen to certain people, but for the majority of people with these diagnoses, the surgery will not be able to change their mindset. These patients need therapy and mental treatments, so a physical surgery will be a waste of time and money. Besides eating disorder patients, a large number of people who choose to undergo plastic surgery are victims of anxiety, depression, or other mental illnesses. These people, just like an eating disorder patient, falsely believe the surgery will fix their mental state. These patients deserve to get mental health treatments because the surgery will most likely not be able to change their mindsets. However, cosmetic surgery can have profoundly wonderful affects for the transgender community and those who have significant facial damage. Trans folk who choose to have surgery so their physical form aligns more closely with their gender identity often feel more comfortable in their own skin and are able to see their external figure the way they want to see it, giving a marginalized and under-recognized group a significant amount of power back over their own lives. Burn victims and other patients who have experienced significant facial deformation also benefit psychologically from plastic surgery; victims of an accident or attack commonly feel much of their power has been taken away, and having a plethora of surgical procedures available to them may make the healing process easier. These procedures are intended to restore normalcy to people who have had traumatic experiences, and help them lead as normal of a life as possible.

Evolution of Contemporary Trends 
Plastic surgery started to become commonly used during the world wars in order to help soldiers and veterans who were injured. Surgeons used skin grafts to reshape faces that had been impacted by bombs and bullets. After, plastic surgery became mainstream in the 1950s for American women to change themselves as beauty standards were changing. Most popular were, and is the third most popular today, rhinoplasties, which is a reconstruction of the nose.  Over the course of the 1900s American beauty standards became more narrow and created a rigid definition of beauty, which made these procedures more common in order to be seen as fitting into the definition of beauty.  Today, many procedure can be done to meet society's definition of beauty and media and research has found the most common procedures sought out each year. The most popular procedure performed in 2018 were breast augmentations, followed by liposuction, nose reshaping, eyelid surgery, and tummy tucks. These procedures have become less invasive and more available as plastic surgeons expand their services and accessibility. These procedures are still expensive, but there are recently more ways to gets parts covered by health insurances. The criteria for medical intervention in contemporary society can be as simple as disliking the appearance of that part of the body; cosmetic surgery is the only medical specialty where the patient decides what is wrong with her and what the course of treatment will be. The prevalence of cosmetic surgery in the United States can make it feel less like a choice and more like a medical need; advertisements in everyday media, worship of celebrities who transform their bodies, and constant critique of the natural female form can suggest that there is something innately wrong or flawed about the way one looks, and surgical intervention is required to "fix" these issues.

References

Body modification
Cultural trends
Plastic surgery